Zen Jun Qian known as Zen Wong (俊倩; born 30 July 1993) is a Malaysian-born Chinese singer-songwriter, actress and an event planner. Graduated from Taylor's University Lakeside Campus in Malaysia with a Bachelor's (HONS) degree in Mass Communication major in Broadcasting in additional to a minor in Advertising. In 2013, Zen Wong, made her debut as a professional singer with her release of her first single "Know Me", which successfully drew attention from the local music industry and with her striking red hair image. In 2014, she won the "NEWAY Top 10 Local Hits Music Most Popularity Award" with her debut single "Know Me" at the "NEWAY Music Awards". She had also subsequently won the "People's Choice Most Outstanding New Artist Award" and the "Best Online Popularity Award". 

In May 2015, she was invited to sing in the opening act for a famous American singer, Demi Lovato concert in Malaysia. Within two years of her debut, Zen has also delivered many notable achievements, including being shortlisted for the Best New Artist at the Malaysia PWH Music Award, the most iconic music award in the Malaysian music industry.

In addition, Zen has also started acting and starred in the web-film "Maybe, Goodbye". In 2018, she entered the acting industry when she was cast as the female lead in the Malaysian-Taiwanese Chinese film called "In My Heart" . The movie was released in 2020 in theatres in Malaysia, Singapore. China, Hong Kong and Taiwan. In 2020, Zen Wong also released her new singles called "Missing You", the movie theme song for the film "In My Heart"

In 2019, she released her first composition, "If I Knew", alongside reputable producer, Hanz Koay. In 2021, she released her full composition music titled, " A Better Us".

Life and career

Early life
Growing up English educated, Zen communicated in English with her mother and minimal mandarin with her father. She had zero knowledge in Chinese characters until she took classes during her university times. 

She joined the National Choir of Malaysia when she was 7 years old, where she gained her performance experience and passion in music.

In 2012, she competed in the China Eastern Association Etiquette Ambassador Competition, and won champion for Malaysia, and emerged second runner's up during the finals in Nanjing, China.

Career beginnings and debut album
In 2013, she was signed by a record label to become a recording artiste, and officially debuted with her first single "Know Me". After her debut, her journey as a singer did not go smoothly. She got cyber-bullied during her first few years in the industry. Fortunately, she did not gave up and continued her faith in music.

In 2014, Zen Wong won the "NEWAY Top 10 Local Hits Music Most Popular Music Award", "People's Choice Most Outstanding New Artist Award" and "Best Online Popularity Award" with her debut singles, "Know Me".

In May 2015, she was selected to perform for the opening of Demi Lovato's concert in Malaysia.

In the same year, she was shortlisted for Best New Artist in the Malaysia PWH Music Award 2015.

In 2016, her song "You Were There" with local singer Thomas Kok won the "NEWAY Top 10 Local Hits Music Video Award". In the same year, Zen Wong starred in the web-film "Maybe, Goodbye", and in 2018, she became the female lead in the Taiwanese - Malaysian Chinese movie named "In My Heart". The movie's theme song, "Missing You", is also performed by Zen Wong.

In 2019, she started her career as a songwriter, and for the first time, she worked with the local producer Hanz Koay to complete the lyrics and music for the song, "If I Knew". The song was written for her late friend artist Emily Kong, who passed away in a car accident earlier that year.

In 2021, she released her own composition called "A Better Us" to encourage people during the depression caused in the society from the Covid-19 pandemic.

Discography
 Know Me (2013) Single 
 Love (2016) Love Story EP Album 
 You Were There (2016) Love Story EP Album 
 If I Knew (2019) Single 
 Missing You (2020) Single 
 A Better Us (2021) Single

Filmography

Film

Awards and achievements

Music

References

External links

 
 
 Zen Jun Qian Youtube Channel
 【艺人疫句】Zen俊倩 静心思考人生的好时机 |Nexttrend
 Zen俊倩全新创作《你会更好的》用歌声让你听见故事！|Woah
 Zen俊倩高分大学毕业首办巡回音乐会拼事业 |Newskaki.com
 Zen俊倩新造型玩纹身　真空上阵拍摄宣传照 |东方网
 Zen俊倩拍摄宣传照真空上阵 新造型玩纹身? 新歌【爱的感觉】516首播|Woah
 Zen俊倩自认在爱情里过于理智 |Almond Magazine
 Zen俊倩小东「爱的感觉」？|Woah

1993 births
Living people
Malaysian film actresses
Malaysian people of Chinese descent
21st-century Malaysian women singers
People from Kuala Lumpur
20th-century Malaysian actresses
21st-century Malaysian actresses